Joaquim Kapango Airport , or Cuíto Airport, is an airport serving Cuíto (known as Silva Porto before 1975), a city in the Bié Province in Angola.

The Joaquim Kapango non-directional beacon (Ident: KU) is located on the field.

Airlines and destinations

See also
 List of airports in Angola
 Transport in Angola

References

External links
 
OpenStreetMap - Joaquim Kapango
OurAirports - Joaquim Kapango

Airports in Angola
Bié Province